Gregory James Studerus (born March 31, 1948) is an American prelate of the Roman Catholic Church who has been serving as an auxiliary bishop for the Archdiocese of Newark in New Jersey since 2020.

Biography

Early life 
Gregory Studerus was born in Orange, New Jersey, on March 31, 1948.  Growing up in West Orange, New Jersey, he attended Our Lady of the Valley High School in Orange. Studerus then entered Montclair State College in Montclair, New Jersey, receiving a bachelor's degree in art education. After his college graduation, he worked for a number of years as an artist and teacher, owning an art gallery and workshop at one point.  After deciding to enter the priesthood, he obtained a Master of Divinity degree.

Priesthood 
On May 31, 1980, Studerus was ordained to the priesthood by Archbishop Peter Leo Gerety for the Archdiocese of Newark.  After his ordination, Studerus was appointed parochial vicar to St. Aloysius Parish in Jersey City, New Jersey.  During this period, he attended Spanish language programs in Mexico and the Dominican Republic. In 1990, Studerus was appointed pastor of St. Bridget Parish in Jersey City. He also  served on the presbyteral council and as dean of the Jersey City Downtown Deanery. In 1997, he was the founding pastor of Resurrection Parish, a combination of five smaller ones.

In 2005, Studerus was appointed pastor of St. Joseph of the Palisades Parish in West New York, New Jersey. In 2005, Pope Benedict XVI named him as a chaplain to his holiness, with the title monsignor.  In 2013, Studerus started a three-year stint as dean of North Hudson Deanery 8. He was appointed episcopal vicar in 2015 for Hudson County, New Jersey.

Auxiliary Bishop of Newark 
Pope Francis appointed Studerus as auxiliary bishop for the Archdiocese of Newark on February 27, 2020. His consecration,  originally scheduled for May 5, 2020, was postponed due to the COVID-19 pandemic.  It finally occurred on June 30, 2020, with Cardinal Joseph William Tobin as the principal consecrator.

See also

 Catholic Church hierarchy
 Catholic Church in the United States
 Historical list of the Catholic bishops of the United States
 List of Catholic bishops of the United States
 Lists of patriarchs, archbishops, and bishops

References

External links

Roman Catholic Diocese of Newark official site

Episcopal succession

1948 births
Living people
21st-century Roman Catholic bishops in the United States
People from West Orange, New Jersey
Bishops appointed by Pope Francis